Coburn Dyas "Cobe" Jones (August 21, 1907 – June 3, 1969) was a Major League Baseball player. Jones played for the Pittsburgh Pirates of the National League for two seasons. In , Jones only played in 1 game and went 1–2. In  Jones played in 28 games, batting .254. Jones was born and died in Denver, Colorado.

External links

 Baseball Almanac page on Cobe Jones

1907 births
1969 deaths
Baseball players from Colorado
Colorado Buffaloes baseball players
Chicago Cubs scouts
St. Louis Cardinals scouts
Colorado College Tigers baseball players 
Pittsburgh Pirates players